Kiniviliame Koroibuleka is a Fijian former rugby footballer who represented Fiji in rugby league at the 1995 World Cup.

Playing career
From Kinoya, Nasinu, Koroibuleka originally played rugby union for the Army. He was selected to represent Fiji in 1992, playing one game against Auckland.

Koroibuleka later switched codes and in 1995 was selected as part of the Fijian squad for that year's Rugby League World Cup.

References

Living people
Fijian rugby league players
Fiji national rugby league team players
1963 births
Rugby league wingers
Fijian rugby union players
Rugby union wings
Fijian soldiers
Dual-code rugby internationals
People from Nasinu
I-Taukei Fijian people